Yerma-Yelan (Yırmayalan) is a rural locality (a village) in Petropavlovsky Selsoviet, Askinsky District, Bashkortostan, Russia. The population was 85 as of 2010. There are 2 streets.

Geography 
Yerma-Yelan is located 18 km northwest of Askino (the district's administrative centre) by road. Novy Kubiyaz is the nearest rural locality.

References 

Rural localities in Askinsky District